Fort Worth is a 1951 American Western film directed by Edwin L. Marin and starring Randolph Scott. It is Marin's final directing work, as he died two months before the release.

Plot
Former gunfighter Ned Britt sets up shop in Fort Worth, Texas, as a newspaper man. He falls in love with Flora Talbot, who is the fiancée of a former friend, Blair Lunsford. Britt tries to expose the crooked cattle baron Gabe Clevinger in his newspaper. Clevinger resorts to violence in order to prevent the arrival of the railroad at Fort Worth. Britt has to rethink his journalistic methods to stop him and resorts to violence himself.

Cast
 Randolph Scott as Ned Britt
 David Brian as Blair Lunsford
 Phyllis Thaxter as Flora Talbot
 Helena Carter as Amy Brooks
 Dickie Jones as Luther Wicks
 Ray Teal as Gabe Clevinger
 Michael Tolan as Mort Springer
 Emerson Treacy as Ben Garvin
 Bob Steele as Shorty
 Walter Sande as Deputy Waller
 Chubby Johnson as Sheriff
 Jack Mower as Railroad Backer (uncredited)

Production
Filming started December 1950.

Reception

Box office
According to Warner Bros records the film earned $1,735,000 domestically and $607,000 foreign.

References

External links
 
 Fort Worth at TCMDB
 
 

1951 films
Warner Bros. films
1951 Western (genre) films
Films directed by Edwin L. Marin
American Western (genre) films
Films scored by David Buttolph
1950s English-language films
Films set in Fort Worth, Texas
1950s American films